Thorbjorn Nelson Mohn, born Torbjørn Nilsen Moen (July 15, 1844 - November 18, 1899) was an American Lutheran church leader and the first president of St. Olaf College.

Background
Torbjørn Nilsen Moen was born in Saude, Norway on July 15, 1844. He was the youngest of eight children of Nils Torbjørnsen Moen and Ragnhild Johnsdatter Rui. He emigrated from Norway with his family in 1852 at age nine. The family first settled in Columbia County, Wisconsin. Eventually they moved to rural Dodge County, Minnesota in 1860. He graduated in 1870 from Luther College in Decorah, Iowa, and from Concordia Seminary in St. Louis in 1873. He was ordained into the Norwegian Synod in 1873.

Career
In May, 1873, Mohn received a call from the congregation of St. Paul's Norwegian Evangelical Church in Chicago from Herman Amberg Preus, President of the Norwegian Synod. Mohn was called the following year as principal of the newly founded St. Olaf's School and pastor of St. John's Lutheran Church in Northfield, Minnesota. St. Olaf opened on January 8, 1875, as an academy or preparatory school in an old public school building that the Northfield community had outgrown. The religious intentions of the institution were clear, but the school began without the official endorsement of any Lutheran church body.
 
The Anti-Missourian Brotherhood began to function as an entity within the Norwegian Synod in 1886. About one third of its congregations left the Synod at its annual meeting in Stoughton, Wisconsin in 1887. Thorbjorn N. Mohn was among the leading advocates of the anti-Missourian position together with Bernt Julius Muus and  John N. Kildahl as well as Luther Seminary Professor Marcus Olaus Bockman. These dissenting "Anti-Missourian Brotherhood" congregations joined in 1890 with the Norwegian Augustana Synod and the Norwegian-Danish Conference to form the United Norwegian Lutheran Church of America. The United Norwegian Lutheran Church first adopted and then abandoned St. Olaf as its official college. Mohn worked for the college's re-adoption by the Church, which occurred in 1899.

References

Other sources
C. A. Mellby, St. Olaf College through Fifty Years, 1874-1924 (Northfield, Mn. 1925)
Johan Arnd Aasgaard, ed., Quarter Centennial Souvenir of St. Olaf College, 1874-1899 (Northfield, Mn. 1900)
Ingebrikt Grose. The Beginnings of St. Olaf College (Studies and Records, 5:110-121. Northfield, Mn. 1930)

External links
President Thorbjorn N. Mohn, (portrait  c. 1887)
Thorstein Veblen and St. Olaf College: a Group of Letters by Thorbjørn N. Mohn Edited by Kenneth Bjork (Norwegian-American Historical Association. Volume 15: Page 122)

1844 births
1899 deaths
19th-century American Lutheran clergy
Norwegian emigrants to the United States
People from Sauherad
Religious leaders from Wisconsin
Luther College (Iowa) alumni
St. Olaf College people
Concordia Seminary alumni